Graciella may refer to:

Graciela (given name)
Graciela (1915–2010), Cuban singer
Graciella (genus), genus of longhorn beetle

See also
Graziella, an 1852 French novel